The  was an electric multiple unit (EMU) train type operated by the Tokyo subway operator Tokyo Metro in Tokyo, Japan. A total of 42 eight-car trainsets were built, between 1988 and 1994, entering service on 1 July 1988.

Operations
The 03 series trains operated on the Tokyo Metro Hibiya Line, with through-running to and from the Tobu Skytree Line and before 2013, on the Tokyu Toyoko Line.

Formations
, the fleet consists of 40 eight-car sets, formed as shown below, with car 1 at the Naka-Meguro (south) end. Sets consist of four motored ("M") cars and four non-powered trailer ("T") cars.

 The M1 cars (cars 2 and 6) each have two lozenge-style pantographs.
 Cars 1, 2, 7, and 8 in sets 09 to 28 have five pairs of doors per side instead of three.

Withdrawal
The 03 series trains began to be replaced by new 13000 series trains from 25 March 2017. The first set to be withdrawn, set 14, was removed for scrapping in February 2017.

The 03 series was fully retired from the Hibiya Line on 28 February 2020 with no fanfare; Tokyo Metro cited the inconvenience created from the crowding of train enthusiasts during the farewell event for the 6000 series as the main reason for this decision.

Resale

Kumamoto Electric Railway 
Three former 03 series EMUs were resold for use by the Kumamoto Electric Railway in Kumamoto Prefecture between 2018 and 2020. They entered service on 4 April 2019.

Nagano Electric Railway 
On 31 January 2020, Nagano Electric Railway announced the second-hand purchase of a few 03 series units, which would be redesignated as the 3000 series. They're intended to replace the older 3500 series (ex-TRTA 3000 series, themselves too ex-Hibiya Line stock) which currently form the backbone of local service rolling stock on the railway.

Hokuriku Railway 
Hokuriku Railway plans to buy a total of five 03 series sets for use on the Asanogawa Line. The first two sets arrived at the railway's depot on 11 January 2020.

Gallery

Interior

Underside equipment

References

External links

 Tokyo Metro Hibiya Line 03 series information 

Electric multiple units of Japan
03 series
Train-related introductions in 1988
Kawasaki multiple units
1500 V DC multiple units of Japan
Nippon Sharyo multiple units
Kinki Sharyo multiple units
Tokyu Car multiple units